Katia Coppola is an Italian football striker, currently playing for FCF Como in Italy's Serie A.

An Under-19 international, she was Italy's top scorer in the 2011 U-19 European Championship with 3 goals.

References

1993 births
Living people
Italian women's footballers
Women's association football forwards
ASD Femminile Inter Milano players
S.S.D. F.C. Como Women players